The Alaska Agricultural and Forestry Experiment Station (AFES) was established in 1898 in Sitka, Alaska, also the site of the first agricultural experiment farm in what was then Alaska Territory. Today the station is administered by the University of Alaska Fairbanks through the School of Natural Resources and Agricultural Sciences. Facilities and programs include the Fairbanks Experiment Farm (est. 1906), the Georgeson Botanical Garden, the Palmer Research and Extension Center, the Matanuska Experiment Farm, and the Reindeer Research Program.

Research at AFES has concentrated on introducing vegetable cultivars appropriate to Alaska and developing adapted cultivars of grains, grasses, potatoes, and berries (for example, strawberries and raspberries). Animal and poultry management was also important in early research, with studies on sheep, yaks, cattle, dairy cows, and swine over the years. Modern animal husbandry study at AFES is focused on reindeer and muskoxen, with some research on fisheries. Other research is in soils (cryosols and carbon cycling studies, for example) and climate change, revegetation, forest ecology and management, and rural and economic development, including energy and biomass research.

History
The Hatch Act of 1887 authorized agricultural experiment stations in the U.S. and its territories to provide science-based research information to farmers. In 1898 the federal government established the Alaska Agricultural Experiment Station in Sitka. The Kodiak station was also established in 1898, operating until 1931. Stations in Kenai (1899–1908), Rampart (1900–1925), Copper Center (1903–1908), and Fairbanks (1906–present) followed quickly. In 1915 the Matanuska Station (now the Matanuska Experiment Farm) was established.

In 1931 the federal government transferred ownership of all experiment station facilities to the College of Agriculture and Mines in Fairbanks. The Sitka and Kodiak stations were closed. The college was renamed the University of Alaska in 1935.

Region-specific variety development
Few varieties of northern-region grains, vegetables, and fruit have been developed for subarctic or arctic areas. The Alaska experiment station works to produce new varieties that will succeed in Alaska's weather conditions, often starting from plant or animal strains used in Scandinavia and Siberia. Below are release dates and varieties developed.

2009. Sunshine hulless barley
2008. Midnight Sun-flower (unofficial release)
2006. Wooding barley
2001. Finnaska, a short-stemmed, high-protein barley
1987. Kenai polargrass
1986. Nortran tufted hairgrass
1983. Alasclear potato
1981. Datal barley; Otal barley; Thual barley; Norcoast Bering hairgrass; Highlat russet potato; Squentna strawberry; Ingal wheat; Nogal wheat; Vidal wheat
1980. Sourdough bluejoint reedgrass
1979. Denali potato
1977. Alaska red potato
1976. Tundra glaucus bluegrass; Alyeska polargrass; Kiska raspberry; Toklat strawberry
1974. Yukon Chief corn
1972. Denali alfalfa; Lidal barley; Weal barley; Ceal oats; Toral oats
1970. Alaska 6467 & 6469 cabbages; Alaska Frostless potato; Early Tanana tomato
1969. Susitna and Matared strawberries
1968. Pioneer strawberry
1965. Nugget Kentucky bluegrass, Polar bromegrass
1964. Arctared red fescue
1963. Alaska russet potato
1961. Stately potato
1959. Alaska 114 potato
1953. Gasser wheat, Alaskaland red clover, Knik potato
1920. Trapmar barley
1905. Sitka hybrid strawberry

References
100 Years of Alaska Agriculture. Agroborealis 30(1), Spring 1998. Fairbanks: University of Alaska.

External links
Agricultural and Forestry Experiment Station homepage
Publications of the station

1898 establishments in Alaska
Buildings and structures in Fairbanks North Star Borough, Alaska
Farms in Alaska
Research institutes established in 1898
Science and technology in Alaska
University of Alaska Fairbanks